Mohamed Malallah Hassan Malallah Mohamed (born 1 April 1984) is an Emirati footballer. who currently plays a former UAE Olympic football team in 2004.

Club career

Al-Khaleej

Mohamed began his career with the Al Khaleej Club. His talent started to evolve something and he rose to the first team and scored many goals with the club.
He also contributed to the rise of the club to the First Division many times.

International career
Malallah played for the UAE at the 2003 FIFA World Youth Championship finals.

References

External links
 
 

1984 births
Living people
Emirati footballers
Khor Fakkan Sports Club players
Al-Nasr SC (Dubai) players
Al-Ittihad Kalba SC players
Al Ain FC players
Al-Shaab CSC players
Emirates Club players
Hatta Club players
Dibba Al-Hisn Sports Club players
2004 AFC Asian Cup players
UAE First Division League players
UAE Pro League players
Association football forwards